Kentucky Reptile Zoo is a non-profit facility in Slade, Kentucky, that specializes in venomous reptiles and the acquisition of venom through a process called venom extraction.  The venom is collected for use in medical research programs as well as for the production of anti-serum. The Kentucky Reptile Zoo is owned by Jim Harrison. The zoo has been featured on PBS, Animal Planet and National Geographic Channel.

References

External links

Zoos in Kentucky
Buildings and structures in Powell County, Kentucky
Tourist attractions in Powell County, Kentucky
Reptile conservation organizations